The non-marine molluscs of Libya are a part of the molluscan fauna of Libya (wildlife of Libya).

A number of species of non-marine molluscs are found in the wild in Libya.

Freshwater gastropods 
Thiaridae
 Melanoides tuberculata (O. F. Müller, 1774)

Land gastropods 
Land gastropods in Libya include:

Veronicellidae
 Eleutherocaulis striatus (Simroth, 1896)

Parmacellidae
 Parmacella alexandrina Ehrenberg, 1831
 Parmacella cfr. deshayesi Moquin-Tandon, 1848
 Parmacella festae Gambetta, 1925
 Parmacella olivieri Cuvier, 1804

Agriolimacidae
 Deroceras barceum (Gambetta, 1924)

Limacidae
 Ambigolimax valentianus  (A. Ferussac, 1822)
 Malacolimax tenellus O. F. Müller, 1774

Milacidae
 Tandonia rustica (Millet, 1843)
 Tandonia sowerbyi (Férussac, 1823)

Polygyridae
 Polygyra cereolus (Megerle von Mühlgeldt, 1818)

Hygromiidae
 Monacha obstructa (L. Pfeiffer, 1842)

See also
Lists of molluscs of surrounding countries:
 List of non-marine molluscs of Egypt, Wildlife of Egypt
 List of non-marine molluscs of Sudan, Wildlife of Sudan
 List of non-marine molluscs of Chad, Wildlife of Chad
 List of non-marine molluscs of Niger, Wildlife of Niger
 List of non-marine molluscs of Algeria, Wildlife of Algeria
 List of non-marine molluscs of Tunisia, Wildlife of Tunisia

oversea countries:
 List of non-marine molluscs of Greece, Wildlife of Greece
 List of non-marine molluscs of Italy, Wildlife of Italy
 List of non-marine molluscs of Malta, Wildlife of Malta

References

 Non marine moll

Molluscs
Libya
Libya